Man Up!  is an American sitcom that aired on ABC from October 18 to December 6, 2011. On December 8, ABC announced the series had been cancelled due to low ratings. Only 8 episodes were aired on television, though all 13 episodes were available online. The episodes remained online through the end of January 2012, when they were removed from ABC's website. All 13 episodes are available to stream on Hulu as of February 2018.

Plot
The series revolves around the lives of three modern men who try to get in touch with their inner "tough guys" and redefine what it means to be a "real man". According to an on-screen graphic at the start of the pilot, the show is set in Gahanna, Ohio.

Cast
 Amanda Detmer as Brenda Hayden
 Christopher Moynihan as Craig Griffith
 Dan Fogler as Kenny Hayden
 Charlotte Labadie as Lucy Keen 
 Henry Simmons as Grant Sweet
 Mather Zickel as Will Keen
 Teri Polo as Theresa Hayden Keen
 Jason Rogel as Henry Trunka
 Jake Johnson as Nathan Keen

Production
The series was poised to be one of the four breakout hits for the 2011-12 television season (along with CBS's 2 Broke Girls, A Gifted Man, and How to Be a Gentleman) according to advertisers who had seen the pilot. Of the four shows, only 2 Broke Girls was renewed for a second season.

Episodes

Critical reception
The series received mixed to average reviews from viewers and mixed to negative reviews from critics.
The Hollywood Reporters Tim Goodman noted that the actors were saddled in a sitcom world of limited potential, asking "How long can they play this joke?" He concluded that "Isn't it really time to let go of stereotypes and clichés and maybe write a sitcom that has more to joke about than one thing over and over again?"
JAM! gave the series a "Thumbs Down", noting that "...if you're pining for the next great male sitcom, this isn't it."
Varietys Brian Lowry noted that "...it'll take more than sociology to pump up this stale sitcom."
The Oregonians Kristi Turnquist called the show "Unfunny" in her short review.
Fantriads Matt Peterson found that among a mixed gender group of 25- to 34-year-olds, Man Up! ranked among the top 5 of weekly watched television series. The group described the show as, "a fresh take on comedy" and "laugh out loud funny," during online polls and questionnaires. Among other shows listed highly by this group were Last Man Standing and Grimm.
TV Guides Matt Roush called the series, "An insult to all genders".

Ratings
The debut episode had a modest start averaging a 2.4/6 among 18-49s, with 7.80 million viewers tuning in. However, it took a hit in its second week, averaging a 2.0/5 among 18-49 with 6.78 million viewers tuning in, a drop of 21% from the first episode. It also found itself among the shows that could become candidates for cancellation according to the TV by the Numbers Renew/Cancel Index based on the show's ratings.

On November 18, 2011, ABC pulled Man Up! from its midseason lineup, despite a statement that it was considered a candidate for a second season pickup. However, TV by the Numbers had the series listed as "de facto canceled" as ABC had not ordered any more episodes, and eleven of the thirteen had already been produced at the time the announcement was made.

On December 8, 2011, ABC pulled Man Up! from the schedule and replaced it with Work It on January 3, 2012, leaving five episodes unaired and effectively cancelling the series altogether. (Work It would fare even worse in the Man Up! time slot, being cancelled after airing just two episodes.) ABC posted the five unaired episodes of Man Up! on the show's website as online exclusive episodes on December 13, 2011; they were removed from the website a month later.

International broadcast

The series was picked up in the following countries:
 In Canada by CTV Two, where it debuted at the same time as the ABC telecast.
 In Australia by Seven Network, starting in 2012.
 In Portugal by FX, starting on February 1, 2012.
 In Norway by TVNorge.
 In Italy by Fox as Cose da uomini (Men's Stuff), starting on April 6 until June 29, 2012.
 In South Korea by FOXlife, starting in May 2012.
 In Thailand by Fox Asia.
 In Israel by HOT3.
 In Turkey by ComedyMax HD.
 In Finland by HeroTV, starting on May 6, 2015.

References

External links 
 

2010s American single-camera sitcoms
2011 American television series debuts
2011 American television series endings
American Broadcasting Company original programming
English-language television shows
Television series by ABC Studios
Television shows set in Columbus, Ohio